Charles Epps may refer to:
 Charles H. Epps Jr. (born 1930), American orthopaedic surgeon
 Charles T. Epps Jr. (1944–2015), American politician in the New Jersey General Assembly

See also
 Charlie Eppes, a character in the TV series Numb3rs